Diuris micrantha, commonly called the dwarf bee orchid or tiny bee orchid, is a rare species of orchid which is endemic to the south-west of Western Australia. It has four to six linear leaves at its base and up to six yellow flowers with reddish brown markings. It grows in swampy places south of Perth.

Description
There is a distinct reddish brown blotch near the tip of the petals. Flowering occurs in September and October.

Taxonomy and naming
Diuris micrantha was first formally described in 1991 by David Jones from a specimen collected in Mandogalup, and the description was published in Australian Orchid Review. The specific epithet (micrantha) is derived from the Ancient Greek words mikros meaning "small" or "little" and anthos meaning "flower", referring to the small flowers of this orchid.

Distribution and habitat
The dwarf bee orchid grows with dense sedges in swampy place between Perth and Boyup Brook in the Jarrah Forest and Swan Coastal Plain biogeographic regions.

Conservation
Diuris micrantha is classified as "vulnerable" under the Australian Government Environment Protection and Biodiversity Conservation Act 1999 and as "Threatened Flora (Declared Rare Flora — Extant)" by the Department of Environment and Conservation (Western Australia). It is threatened by weeds and by inappropriate fire regimes, especially by fires in winter and spring.

References

micrantha
Endemic orchids of Australia
Orchids of Western Australia
Endemic flora of Western Australia
Plants described in 1991